C.A. Rosetti is a commune in Tulcea County, Northern Dobruja, Romania. The commune is named for writer and politician Constantin Alexandru Rosetti. It is composed of five villages: C.A. Rosetti, Cardon, Letea, Periprava and Sfiștofca. At the 2011 census, 65.7% of the inhabitants were Romanians, 24.3% Russian Lipovans and 9.8% Ukrainians.

The same census found that Letea (Russian: Летя, Letya) village had 348 inhabitants, down from 404 in 2002. Of those, 399 were native speakers of Romanian and 5 of Ukrainian. The painter  (1883–1961) was born in Letea.

The Periprava labor camp operated near the village of Periprava during communist rule.

Notes

References

Communes in Tulcea County
Localities in Northern Dobruja